Ablogamé is a neighborhood of Lomé, Togo.  A downtown area, it forms a district around the Port of Lomé.

Economy
The neighborhood contains the Eglise des Assemblées de Dieu temple and Marché et Ambiance, a thriving market. Several hotels are also located here, including Hotel Mercure Sarakawa and Veronica Guesthouse.

In the mid 1980s, the DRDR organized vegetable growers meeting groups in the port area for the locals. In 1987,  about 4,000 plots between 200 and 250 hectares, in the neighborhoods of Ablogamé and Akodessewa had a market value of 800 million CF.

References

Neighborhoods of Lomé